The Dominican Republic national field hockey team represents the Dominican Republic in international men's field hockey and is controlled by the Dominican Hockey Federation. The team are a member of the Pan American Hockey Federation, the governing body for field hockey in the Americas.

The Dominican Republic has never qualified for the Summer Olympics or the World Cup.

Tournament record

Pan American Games
 2003 – 8th place

Central American and Caribbean Games
 2006 – 8th place
 2010 – 5th place
 2014 – 5th place
 2018 – 8th place
 2023 – Qualified

Bolivarian Games
 2013 –

See also
 Dominican Republic women's national field hockey team

References

External links
 National Hockey Federation Website

Americas men's national field hockey teams
National team
Field Hockey
Men's sport in the Dominican Republic